Helmand University is located in Lashkar Gah, capital of Helmand province, southern Afghanistan. It was established in 2006. Helmand university has faculties of Economics, Agriculture and Education.

Departments

Departments of Faculty of Economics
  Banking
  Management and Administration

Departments of Faculty of Agriculture
  Horticulture
  Agri-economics and extension
  Animal Sciences
  Plant Sciences

Departments of Faculty of Education
  Biology
  Chemistry
  Maths
  Geography
  English
  Islamic Culture
  Arts
  Computer
  Vocational Studies

See also 
List of universities in Afghanistan

References

Universities in Afghanistan
Buildings and structures in Helmand Province
University
Educational institutions established in 2006
2006 establishments in Afghanistan